Desert Victory is a 1943 film produced by the British Ministry of Information, documenting the Allies' North African campaign against Field Marshal Erwin Rommel and the Afrika Korps. This documentary traces the struggle between General Erwin Rommel and Field Marshal Bernard Montgomery, from the German's defeat at El Alamein to Tripoli. The film was produced by David MacDonald and directed by Roy Boulting who also directed Tunisian Victory and Burma Victory. Like the famous "Why We Fight" series of films by Frank Capra, Desert Victory relies heavily on captured German newsreel footage.  Many of the most famous sequences in the film have been excerpted and appear with frequency in History Channel and A&E productions. The film won a special Oscar in 1943 and the 1951 film The Desert Fox: The Story of Rommel took sections of the film for its battle footage.

See also
 List of Allied Propaganda Films of World War 2

References

External links
 
 

1943 films
1943 war films
1943 documentary films
British documentary films
British World War II propaganda films
Black-and-white documentary films
1940s English-language films
Best Documentary Feature Academy Award winners
Films directed by Roy Boulting
Films scored by William Alwyn
20th Century Fox films
British black-and-white films